Shane Montgomery (born March 14, 1967) is an American football coach and former player.  His most recent position was as the offensive coordinator and quarterbacks coach at the University at Buffalo. Montgomery served as the head football coach at Miami University from 2005 to 2008, compiling a record of 17–31.

Playing career
A Newark, Ohio native, Montgomery attended Newark Catholic High School where he helped the Green Wave to two state championships.
Montgomery played quarterback at North Carolina State University in the late 1980s.  He ended his career with 5,298 yards passing and 31 touchdowns.  In 1989, he passed for 535 yards in a game against Duke, which still stands as NC State's single-game record.  He was also named MVP of both the 1988 Peach Bowl and 1989 Copper Bowl.

Coaching career
As an assistant, Montgomery coached several NFL players including Ben Roethlisberger and Terrell Owens.  Montgomery's first job as an assistant coach was at University of Tennessee at Chattanooga from 1993 to 2000.  He moved to Miami University in Oxford, Ohio as an offensive coordinator for Terry Hoeppner in 2001. Montgomery was a 2003 finalist for the Broyles Award, given annually to the nation's top college football assistant coach.

After spending four years as an assistant at Miami University, Montgomery became the RedHawks' 32nd head coach succeeding Hoeppner, who became head coach at Indiana University.  In his first year the RedHawks posted a 7–4 record including a tie for first place in the MAC East division.   University of Akron won the tie breaker and represented the East in the MAC Championship Game.  On November 29, 2008, Montgomery resigned as Head Coach of the RedHawks, after four seasons and a 17–31 record.

On December 26, 2017, Montgomery was named the new offensive coordinator at Charlotte after spending the previous 8 years as the offensive coordinator at Youngstown State University.

On May 12, 2021, Montgomery was named the new offensive coordinator for the Buffalo Bulls. His first season saw the Bulls drop from the fifth-most points per game among 128 Football Bowl Subdivision (FBS) teams to 57th-most of 130 FBS teams.  After the 2022 season it was announced that he was no longer with the Bull's football program.

Head coaching record

References

External links
 Buffalo profile
 James Madison profile
 Youngstown State profile

1967 births
Living people
American football quarterbacks
Akron Zips football coaches
Buffalo Bulls football coaches
Chattanooga Mocs football coaches
James Madison Dukes football coaches
Miami RedHawks football coaches
NC State Wolfpack football coaches
NC State Wolfpack football players
Raleigh–Durham Skyhawks players
Youngstown State Penguins football coaches
Sportspeople from Newark, Ohio
Coaches of American football from Ohio
Players of American football from Ohio